CDIC can refer to:

 Canada Deposit Insurance Corporation
 Canada Development Investment Corporation
 Chaland de débarquement d'infanterie et de chars
Central Commission for Discipline Inspection